The China Banking and Insurance Regulatory Commission (CBIRC) is an agency of the People's Republic of China (PRC) authorised by the State Council to

 Supervise the establishment and ongoing business activities of banking and insurance institutions.
 Take enforcement actions against regulatory violations.

The CBIRC was established in April 2018 by a merger of China's banking and insurance regulators, namely, the China Banking Regulatory Commission (CBRC) and China Insurance Regulatory Commission (CIRC).

A plan to overhaul government agencies announced in March 2023 would eliminate the CBIRC.

References 

Government agencies of China
Financial regulatory authorities of China
Banking in China
Insurance in China
Government agencies established in 2018
2018 establishments in China
Regulation in China
Organizations based in Beijing
Insurance regulation